The 2007 UNAF Women's Club Tournament is the first edition of the UNAF Women's Club Tournament. The clubs from Algeria, Egypt, Morocco and Tunisia faced off for the title. The moroccan team FC Berrechid wins the tournament.

Teams
Wadi Degla SC was chosen by the Egyptian Football Association as an Egyptian representative, the Egyptian Women's Premier League was cancelled since the 2002–03 season.

Tournament
The competition played in a round-robin tournament determined the final standings. It's hosted in Tunis, Tunisia.

References

External links
Première Coupe d'Afrique du Nord de Football Féminin 2007 - rsssf.com

UNAF Women's Club Tournament
2007 in African football